A safe (also called a strongbox or coffer) is a secure lockable box used for securing valuable objects against theft or fire. A safe is usually a hollow cuboid or cylinder, with one face being removable or hinged to form a door. The body and door may be cast from metal (such as steel) or formed out of plastic through blow molding. Bank teller safes typically are secured to the counter, have a slit opening for dropping valuables into the safe without opening it, and a time-delay combination lock to foil thieves. One significant distinction between types of safes is whether the safe is secured to a wall or structure or if it can be moved around. A less secure version (only suitable for petty cash) is usually called a cash-box.

History

The first known safe dates back to the 13th century BC and was found in the tomb of Pharaoh Ramesses II. It was made of wood and consisted of a locking system resembling the modern pin tumbler lock.
 
In the 16th century, blacksmiths in southern Germany, Austria, and France first forged cash boxes in sheet iron. These sheet-iron money chests served as the models for mass-produced cash boxes in the 19th century.

In the 17th century, in northern Europe, iron safes were sometimes made in the shape of a barrel, with a padlock on top.

In 1835, English inventors Charles and Jeremiah Chubb in Wolverhampton, England, received a patent for a burglar-resisting safe and began a production of safes. The Chubb brothers had produced locks since 1818. Chubb Locks was an independent company until 2000 when it was sold to Assa Abloy.

On November 2, 1886, inventor Henry Brown patented a "receptacle for storing and preserving papers". The container was fire retardant and accident resistant as it was made from forged metal. The box was able to be safely secured with a lock and key and also able to maintain organization by offering different slots to organize important papers.

Specifications
Specifications for safes include some or all of the following parameters:
 Burglar-resistance
 Fire-resistance
 Environmental resistance (e.g., to water or dust)
 Type of lock (e.g., combination, key, time lock, electronic locking)
 Location (e.g., wall safe, floor safe)
 Smart safes as part of an automated cash handling system

It is often possible to open a safe without access to the key or knowledge of the combination; this activity is known as safe-cracking and is a popular theme in heist films.

A diversion safe, or hidden safe, is a safe that is made from an otherwise ordinary object such as a book, a candle, a can, or even a wall outlet plug. Valuables are placed in these hidden safes, which are themselves placed inconspicuously (for example, a book would be placed on a book shelf).

Fire resistant record protection equipment consists of self-contained devices that incorporate insulated bodies, doors, drawers or lids, or non-rated multi-drawer devices housing individually rated containers that contain one or more inner compartments for storage of records. These devices are intended to provide protection to one or more types of records as evidenced by the assigned Class rating or ratings; Class 350 for paper, Class 150 for microfilm, microfiche other and photographic film and Class 125 for magnetic media and hard drives.

These types of enclosures can be rated for periods of ½-, 1-, 2- and 4-hour durations.

In addition, these enclosures may be rated for their impact resistance, should the safe fall a number of feet to a lower level or have debris fall upon it during a fire.

Burglary resistant safes are rated as to their resistance to the type of tools to be used in their attack and also the duration of the attack.

The attack durations are for periods of 15 minutes, 30 minutes and 60 minutes.

Safes can also contain hardware that automatically dispenses cash or validates bills as part of an automated cash handling system.

Room-sized fireproof vaults

For larger volumes of heat-sensitive materials, a modular room-sized vault is much more economical than purchasing and storing many fire rated safes. Typically these room-sized vaults are utilized by corporations, government agencies and off-site storage service firms. Fireproof vaults are rated up to Class 125-4 Hour for large data storage applications. These vaults utilize ceramic fiber, a high temperature industrial insulating material, as the core of their modular panel system. All components of the vault, not just the walls and roof panels, must be Class 125 rated to achieve that overall rating for the vault. This includes the door assembly (a double door is needed since there is no single Class 125 vault door available), cable penetrations, coolant line penetrations (for split HVAC systems), and air duct penetrations.

There are also Class 150 applications (such as microfilm) and Class 350 vaults for protecting valuable paper documents. Like the data-rated (Class 125) structures, these vault systems employ ceramic fiber insulation and components rated to meet or exceed the required level of protection.

In recent years room-sized Class 125 vaults have been installed to protect entire data centers. As data storage technologies migrate from tape-based storage methods to hard drives, this trend is likely to continue.

Fire-resistant safes

A fire-resistant safe is a type of safe that is designed to protect its contents from high temperatures or actual fire. Models are typically available between half-hour and four-hour durations.

In the UK the BS EN-1047 standard is set aside for data and document safes to determine their ability to withstand prolonged intense heat and impact damage.
These conditions are maintained for the duration of the test. This is usually at least 30 minutes but can extend to many hours depending on grade.
Both kinds of safe are also tested for impact by dropping from a set height onto a solid surface and then tested for fire survivability once again.

In the United States, both the writing of standards for fire-resistance and the actual testing of safes is performed by Underwriters Laboratories.

An in-floor safe installed in a concrete floor is very resistant to fire. However, not all floor safes are watertight and will often fill with water from fire hoses, therefore everything stored inside should be placed in either double zip lock bags, dry bags, or sealed plastic containers.

Reinforced, fireproof cabinets are also used for dangerous chemicals or flammable goods.

Wall safes
Wall safes are designed to provide hidden protection for documents and miscellaneous valuables. Adjustable depth allows the maximization of usable space when installed in different wall thicknesses. Some wall safes feature pry-resistant recessed doors with concealed hinges for anti-theft protection. A painting can be hung over a wall safe to obscure it from public view.

Jewelry safes
Jewelry safes are burglary and fire safes made specifically to house jewelry and valuables. These high end safes are typically manufactured with interior jewelry chests of fine woods and fabric liners with a range of organizational configurations.

Safe-cracking

Safe cracking is opening a safe without a combination or key. There are many methods of safe cracking ranging from brute force methods to guessing the combination. The easiest method that can be used on many safes is "safe bouncing", which involves hitting the safe on top; this may cause the locking pin to budge, opening the safe.

UL certification for safes
Underwriters Laboratories (UL) testing certifications for safes are known to be some of the most rigorous and most respected in the world. They are only matched by B.T.U/VDMA certifications (Germany).

J.I.S. (Japan) and CSTB (France) preheat the oven with the safe inside until the temperature reaches the desired setting (as opposed to a sustained temperature of the rating), then the safe is cooled artificially (as opposed to naturally). Rarely are safes dropped  or more and they are usually artificially cooled by the fire department. UL also runs an indirect explosion test on all safes. Additionally UL-768 certifies the combination lock against tampering. UL-140 certifies a relocking mechanism that will permanently lock the safe bolts, in case an electronic lock fails or a UL-768 rated lock is compromised.

Class 125
This class was introduced with the emergence of floppy disks. The containers are tested with only non-paper media, but are clearly sufficient to hold paper.

However, Underwriters Laboratories (UL) does not state data on Blu-ray disks, DVDs or CDs. Only floppy disks, which are no longer a common storage medium, is stated.

An added benefit of this container is that it has water-resistant seal on its door. However UL does not check for water resistance and all fire-insulated safes are not tightly sealed. When exposed to heat, the insulation expands and  seals all joints tightly which is supposed to keep water out. If a safe is submerged in water without any prior exposure to heat, water will seep in.  These class ratings are used in conjunction with hour ratings such as: ½, 1, 2, 3, or 4.

Class 150
This class was introduced with the emergence of computer data tapes or magnetic reel-to-reel tapes. UL tests this with paper and non-paper articles. This container is also sufficient in storing some optical media, such as compact disks. Cases can be purchased that will meet Class 125, if they are placed inside a Class 150 safe. Some may be waterproof due to a gasket on the door and the label will state this. These class ratings are used in conjunction with hour ratings such as: ½, 1, 2, 3, or 4.

Class 350
This is the most basic of U.L. tests and specifically tests for the storage of paper. Cases can be purchased that will meet Class 125, if they are placed inside a Class 350 container. These class ratings are used in conjunction with hour ratings such as: ½, 1, 2, 3, or 4.

Residential security container 

While colloquially called "gun safes" in North America, residential security containers do not meet the same UL standards against burglary and tool resistance as described below. They have their own UL standard (UL 1037), which is much less rigorous against attacks (having to withstand attacks for only five minutes), and are generally only to be used in non-commercial settings. However their burglary and fire resistance may surpass the minimum UL 1037 standard, usually with increased price which is translated into added metal, better design and firewall in the safe.

Class TL-15
This is a combination locked safe that offers limited protection against combinations of common mechanical and electrical tools. The safe will resist abuse for 15 minutes from tools such as hand tools, picking tools, mechanical or electric tools, grinding points, carbide drills and devices that apply pressure. Anything with a TL-rating conforms to UL 687.

Class TL-30
This is a combination locked safe that offers moderate protection against combinations of mechanical and electrical tools. The safe will resist abuse for 30 minutes from tools such as hand tools, picking tools, mechanical or electrical tools, grinding points, carbide drills, devices that apply pressure, cutting wheels and power saws.

Class TL-40
This is a combination locked safe that offers moderate protection against combinations of mechanical and electrical tools. The safe will resist abuse for 40 minutes from tools such as hand tools, picking tools, mechanical or electrical tools, grinding points, carbide drills, devices that apply pressure, cutting wheels and power saws.

Class TRTL-30
This is a combination locked safe that offers high protection against combinations of mechanical, electrical, and cutting tools. The safe will resist abuse for 30 minutes from tools such as hand tools, picking tools, mechanical or electrical tools, grinding points, carbide drills, devices that apply pressure, cutting wheels, power saws, impact tools and, in addition, can withstand an oxy-fuel welding and cutting torch (tested gas limited to  combined total oxygen and fuel gas.)

Class TRTL-60
This class will withstand the same assaults as Class TRTL-30 for 60 minutes.

Class TXTL-60

European safe standards
Depending on the usage, the European Committee for Standardization has published different European standards for safes. Testing and certification according to these standards should be done by an accredited certification body, e.g. European Certification Body.
 EN 1143-1 is the main testing standard for safes, ATM safes, strongroom doors and strongrooms. For safes it features eleven resistance grades (0, I, II, ..., to X). From one grade to the next the security rises by approximately 50%. Testing is based on a free choice of attack tools and methods. Testing requires partial access (hand hole) and complete access attempts, on all sides of the product. The security is calculated by using ratings of tools and the attack time. The result is expressed in resistance units (RU).
 EN 14450 is a testing standard for secure cabinets and strongboxes. The standard covers products meant for purposes where the security resistance required is less than that of EN 1143–1.

For fire-resistant safes the EN 1047-1 (fire resistance standard similar to the fire resistance safe standard of UL) and EN 15659 (for light fire storage units) were published.

Gallery

See also
 Access control
 Concealment device, an inconspicuous object used to hide things
 United States government safe and vault door specifications
 Gun safe
 Lock, a mechanical fastening device
 Manual override, opening a safe without cracking it
 Physical security
 Safe deposit box, a lightweight safe
 Security
 Safe room
 Strongroom, a bank vault
 Time-delay combination locks

References

Further reading
 Locks, Safes, and Security: An International Police Reference, published by Charles Thomas Publishers, Springfield, Illinois, United States. (2000) .

External links

Money containers
Security technology
Cuboids